The Kirghiz Autonomous Socialist Soviet Republic was an autonomous republic of the Soviet Union within the Russian Socialist Federative Soviet Republic existing from 1926 until 1936.

The Kirghiz ASSR was created on 11 February 1926 in the former region of Soviet Central Asia, within the Russian SFSR, when Kirghiz AO was reorganized as ASSR. On 5 December 1936 it became elevated to Kirghiz SSR (independent of Russian SFSR), one of the constituent republics of the Soviet Union.

References 

Post–Russian Empire states
Autonomous republics of the Russian Soviet Federative Socialist Republic
States and territories established in 1926
Kirghiz Soviet Socialist Republic
Former socialist republics
1926 establishments in the Soviet Union
1936 disestablishments in the Soviet Union

de:Kirgisische Sozialistische Sowjetrepublik#Entwicklung